Milton Collins (born March 9, 1985) was a former Canadian football defensive back who played in the Canadian Football League.  He was signed by the Calgary Stampeders as an undrafted free agent in 2008. He was released from the Hamilton Tiger-Cats during training camp in June 2012 after only playing a handful of games with the team. He played college football at Ole Miss.

1985 births
Living people
American players of Canadian football
Calgary Stampeders players
Hamilton Tiger-Cats players
Saskatchewan Roughriders players
Canadian football defensive backs
Ole Miss Rebels football players
Players of American football from New Orleans
Players of Canadian football from New Orleans